Couch Park is a city park in Portland, Oregon, located at the intersection of Northwest 19th Avenue and Glisan Street. Named after merchant John H. Couch, the park was acquired in 1977.

The park is located adjacent to the Metropolitan Learning Center, a public, Kx12 magnet school.

History

Couch Park was named after Captain John Heard Couch, who sailed from Newburyport, Massachusetts for Portland in 1839. Couch owned and developed land from the Willamette River to what is now Northwest 23rd Avenue and from Burnside north for one mile. Blocks were named alphabetically as the land was developed, forming today's Alphabet District.  The site of Couch Park was once the estate of 19th-century merchant Cicero Hunt Lewis, the husband of Couch's daughter Clementine.  The estate included a mansion, stables and a greenhouse, each constructed in 1881.  The Portland School District acquired the property in 1913 following demolition and constructed a school bearing Couch's name, replacing the first building built in 1882 at Northwest 17th and Kearney. Land that is now Couch Park was then the school's playground.

Captain John Brown's house, constructed in 1890, was moved to one corner of the site in 1970 to spare demolition.  Residents donated money to convert the house into a community center for senior citizens as well as medical services.  However, the project was abandoned when funding received was less than required. In 1973 the heavily vandalized building was demolished.

Couch School's name was changed to the Metropolitan Learning Center (MLC) in 1974. This left only the park with Couch's name. Planning and construction for the park, including its play structure, began in 1975, a process which included MLC students and neighboring residents. Three art installations were erected in 1976; these included a steel sculpture by David Cotter, tile mosaics by Jere Grimm and carved wood pillars which support the playground by Brent Jenkins, Eric Jensen and William Moore. The park was officially acquired in 1977.

In 2010 funds provided by The Opus Foundation ($50,000) and a voter-approved 2002 levy allowed improvements to be made to the park. The playground was upgraded to improve accessibility and safety, which included the construction of a fence.

Features
The park features a basketball court, an off-leash area for dogs, paved paths, a playground and public restrooms. As of 2010 more than one hundred trees representing dozens of tree types exist in the park, including birch, cedar, elm, fir, maple, pine, various fruit trees and others. European white birch and English are the most abundant species in the park. Couch Park was included in the book A Bark in the Park: The 45 Best Places to Hike with Your Dog in the Portland, Oregon Region (2005).

See also

 List of parks in Portland, Oregon
 National Register of Historic Places listings in Northwest Portland, Oregon

References

External links

 Couch Park off-leash area map (PDF), Portland Parks & Recreation
 Couch Park off-leash hours (PDF), Portland Parks & Recreation
 Map of Portland's Pearl District and Nob Hill (PDF), including Couch Park
 Portland City Walks: Twenty Explorations in and Around Town (2008) entry for Couch Park

1977 establishments in Oregon
Northwest District, Portland, Oregon
Parks in Portland, Oregon
Protected areas established in 1977
Urban public parks